The Diocese of Salpi or Diocese of Salapia (Latin: Dioecesis Salpensis) was a Roman Catholic diocese located in the Italian town of Salpi in Daunia near Cerignola and Manfredonia. In 1547, the diocese was suppressed and its territory assigned to the Archdiocese of Trani. It was restored as a titular see in 1966.

History
450?: Erected as Diocese of Salpi
1424: Suppressed to the Archdiocese of Trani
1523: Restored as the Diocese of Salpi from the Archdiocese of Trani
1547 April 22: Suppressed to the Archdiocese of Trani
1966: Restored as the Titular Episcopal See of Salpi

Bishops of Salpi
Erected: 450
Latin Name: Salpensis
Metropolitan: Archdiocese of Bari (-Canosa)

Guillermus Ludovicus, O.S.B., former monk of St Paul of Cormery and chaplan in Nicomedia (attested around 1101 or 1102)
Nicolas Antonio (bishop), O.P. (22 Apr 1422 Appointed – )
...
Mario Hispanus (16 Mar 1523 – 1532 Died)
Gaspar Flores (13 Nov 1532 – 1544 Died)
Domenico Stella (Tommaso Stella), O.P. (9 May 1544 – 22 Apr 1547 Appointed, Bishop of Lavello)

1547: Suppressed to the Archdiocese of Trani

References

Former Roman Catholic dioceses in Italy